Layeni may refer to:

the former name of Triantafyllia, Florina, a village in the Florina regional unit, northern Greece
Layoni, Indonesia, a village in the Maluku Islands of Indonesia
a Yoruba surname from Nigeria
 Stefano Layeni, a football (soccer) player, play for Calcio Prato
 

Yoruba-language surnames